Thomas Heaney (2 April 1888 – 17 August 1928) was an Australian rules footballer who played in the VFA between 1906 and 1907 then in the VFL from 1908 until 1913 for the Richmond Football Club. He played for the Fitzroy Football Club between 1913 and 1917 and then again between 1919 and 1921. Finally he played three games for the Port Melbourne Football Club back in the VFA in 1922.

Death
Heaney died from illness, on 17 August 1928, aged 40.

Notes

References
 Hogan P: The Tigers Of Old, Richmond FC, Melbourne 1996

External links

 
 

1888 births
1928 deaths
Australian rules footballers from Melbourne
Australian Rules footballers: place kick exponents
Richmond Football Club players
Fitzroy Football Club players
Fitzroy Football Club Premiership players
Port Melbourne Football Club players
Richmond Football Club (VFA) players
Two-time VFL/AFL Premiership players
People from Collingwood, Victoria